Xuanhua may refer to:

Xuanhua District (宣化区), Zhangjiakou, Hebei, China
Xuanhua, Gansu (宣化镇), town in Gaotai County, Gansu, China
Xuanhua, Henan (宣化镇), town in Dengfeng City, Henan, China
Hsuan Hua (1918–1995), or Xuanhua, influential Chan Buddhist monk